Samuel Morley may refer to:

Samuel Morley (VC) (1829–1888), recipient of the Victoria Cross
Samuel Morley (MP) (1809–1886), British Member of Parliament and philanthropist
 Samuel Morley, 1st Baron Hollenden (1845–1929), British businessman
 Samuel Morley (bishop) (1841–1923), Bishop of Tinnevelly
Sam Morley (Samuel Robertson Morley, born 1932), American football player